Shiva, stage name of Andrea Arrigoni (born August 27, 1999) is an Italian rapper.

He debuted with the studio album Tempo anima in January 2017.
In 2020 his single "Auto blu" featuring Eiffel 65 peaked number 1 of FIMI's single chart for three weeks.

Discography

Studio albums 
 Tempo anima (2017)
 Solo (2018)
 Dolce Vita (2021)
 Milano Demons (2022)

EPs 
 Routine (2020)
 Dark Love (2022)

References

Italian rappers
Living people
21st-century Italian male singers
1999 births